Rufus Early Clement (June 26, 1900 – November 7, 1967) was the sixth and longest-serving president of historically black Atlanta University in Atlanta, Georgia.

Career
A native of Salisbury, North Carolina, Clement started out as a professor and then dean of Livingstone College in Salisbury. Clement then served as the first dean of Louisville Municipal College, now known as Simmons College of Kentucky. In 1937, he was named president of Atlanta University, position which he held until his death some thirty years later.

W. E. B. Du Bois suspected Clement of being behind Du Bois' forced retirement from Atlanta University in 1944. At least one author supports this theory, arguing that Du Bois' confrontational approach to civil rights for African Americans clashed with Clement's more accommodationist inclination.

In 1953, Clement was elected to the Atlanta School Board, having become the first black since Reconstruction to hold public office in Atlanta.

In the 1966 gubernatorial election, Clement endorsed the Republican nominee, U.S. Representative Howard "Bo" Callaway, who challenged the Democrat Lester Maddox, a businessman and staunch segregationist who had closed his Pickrick Restaurant to avoid integration. Clement and the Negro Baptist Convention argued that the only way to prevent Maddox's election was for blacks to support Callaway though many in the minority group opposed Callaway's conservative voting record in Congress. Ultimately as a result of an election impasse, the Georgia General Assembly elected Maddox as governor, 182 to 66.

Family
Clement's nephew George Clement Bond is an anthropologist at Columbia University in New York City. Another nephew is J. Max Bond, Jr., architect. Clement is also related to Horace Mann Bond.

Clement's son-in-law, Robert Joseph Pershing Foster, was Ray Charles' personal physician.

References

External links
 

Heads of universities and colleges in the United States
1900 births
1967 deaths
Activists for African-American civil rights
People from Salisbury, North Carolina
People from Atlanta
Clark Atlanta University faculty
Simmons College of Kentucky people
Activists from North Carolina
Livingstone College faculty
School board members in Georgia (U.S. state)
20th-century American academics